The 2023 Tulane Green Wave football team will represent Tulane University in the American Athletic Conference (AAC) during the 2023 NCAA Division I FBS football season. The Green Wave are expected to be led by Willie Fritz in his eighth year as head coach. They play their home games at Yulman Stadium in New Orleans, Louisiana. They enter this season as the defending AAC champions.

Previous season 

The Green Wave finished the 2022 season with a 12–2 record and a win in the Cotton Bowl against No. 10 USC, 46-45 on a game winning touchdown with 9 seconds left to Alex Bauman. They also won the AAC Championship over UCF 45-28.

Offseason

Transfers

Outgoing

Incoming

Schedule

Roster

Game Summaries

vs. South Alabama

vs. Ole Miss

at Southern Miss

vs. Nicholls

vs. UAB

at Memphis

vs. North Texas

at Rice

at East Carolina

vs. Tulsa

at Florida Atlantic

vs. UTSA

References 

Tulane Green Wave football seasons
Tulane
Tulane Green Wave football